The Phillips family, consisting of Thomas Phillips and his three children Jayda, Maverick, and Ember, are a New Zealand family who have not been seen since 9 December 2021. They were previously considered missing for 18 days in September 2021, sparking a major search effort. There is a warrant for Thomas Phillips' arrest in relation to the first disappearance.

Background
Thomas Phillips lived in Ōtorohanga with his three children Jayda (born 18 June 2013), Maverick (born 21 November 2014), and Ember (born 20 January 2016). They also spent much of their time at the family farm in Marokopa. Phillips had separated from his wife of eight years, Catherine, a few years prior, and was homeschooling his kids as he himself had been. He was an experienced hunter and camper. The Phillips family had farmed in the area for generations and were well-respected.

First disappearance (September 2021)
The Phillips' had last been seen on 11 September at the family farm in Marokopa. Two days later their Toyota Hilux was found parked below the tideline at the nearby Kiritehere beach, being battered by waves. The car keys were under the driver's side mat. Police launched a search operation and a rāhui was placed on the area, disrupting local whitebait fishing. Searchers initial assessment was that they had most likely been swept out to sea. Despite daily searches of land, sky, and sea, involving a plane, helicopter, jet ski, inflatable rescue boat, and heat-detecting drones, no trace was found. The search base at Marokopa Hall was stood down on 19 September and daily searches were suspended on 24 September.

Phillips and his children were sighted in the morning of 30 September, riding a bike on Mangatoa Road. Police dispatched a plane but were unable to find them. Later in the morning, they "walked through the door" of the family farm. Phillips' sister stated that he had "wanted space to clear his head" and had been living in a tent 15km inland from the beach where his ute had been found. The children were perfectly healthy, described as "bouncy as ever" by their grandmother. A friend of Phillips alleged that he had parked the ute in a car park near where he was camping but that it had been stolen, taken for a joyride and dumped at the beach. With the cost of the search estimated in the hundreds of thousands of dollars, Phillips was charged with wasting police resources, with a court date set for 5 November. This was delayed to 12 January 2022 due to COVID-19 restrictions.

Second disappearance (December 2021 – present)
Phillips "went bush" with his kids again in December, last being seen on 9 December. The police did not initiate a search, stating that he had notified his family of where he was going and was not in violation of court restrictions. He did not show up to his court date on 12 January and thus an arrest warrant was issued. His lawyer had not heard from him since first informing him of the court date. His ute was discovered parked on Mangatoa Road in late January. Phillips returned home for about an hour at night on 9 February to get supplies, telling his family that the children were okay but not disclosing their location. By that point he had grown a beard. The police, the children's mother, and Ōtorohanga mayor Max Baxter all stated that they believe he is receiving additional help to survive.

The older half-sisters of the Phillips children launched a petition in May, calling on the police and relevant government ministries to do more to find them. Police subsequently made a public appeal for information on Ten 7 Aotearoa. There were two reported sightings of the children in May, but these were later dismissed by police. The children's maternal family planned for a search in June, but this was cancelled due to concerns from police. In August, police posited the idea that the Phillips family may have changed their names and started a new life elsewhere in the country.

Police declined to offer a reward for the children's return in September, so in October their maternal family began fundraising on Givealittle to offer a $10,000 reward themselves. They only managed to raise around half of that, but said they will supply the remaining reward money themselves.

See also 
List of people who disappeared

References

2020s missing person cases
2021 in New Zealand
Fugitives
History of Waikato
Missing New Zealand children
Missing person cases in New Zealand
Mass disappearances